RVS College of Arts and Science (RVS CAS) is an ISO 9001:2000 certified institute in Coimbatore, Tamil Nadu, India.
It is established in the year 1986. The college is affiliated to Bharathiar University, Coimbatore. The campus is located adjacent to the Coimbatore-Trichy highway at Sulur.

History
Rathinavel Subramaniam College of Arts and Science is started as first self-financing college under Bharathiar University in 1986. Within a brief span of two decades the college has developed as one of the largest self-financing colleges in Coimbatore region in terms of student strength, number of academic programmes and faculty strength. The college is managed by RVS Trust.

Timeline 
 1986: College established.
 2001: The college got NAAC accreditation at four star level.
 2004: Autonomous status confirmed in September.
 2007: Attained B++ status on reaccreditation.
 Reaccrediate with "A" grade by NAAC.

Courses 
 Fifteen undergraduate courses including arts and science courses like B.Com., Life Sciences, BCA, Psychology,  English, and Management,
 BSc courses in Mathematics, Biochemistry, Biotechnology, Microbiology, Nutrition and Dietetics, Data Science, Electronics, IoT and Computer Science,
 Fourteen postgraduate programmes,
 M.Phil and Ph.D programmes.

Motto
"Join Us!! We shall grow together amidst the glow of Academic Excellence!!!"

Online Results
RVS College of Arts & Science declares the UG & PG Comprehensive Examinations Results on the official website of the college. All the students can check their  UG & PG Exam Results just by entering their Register Numbers on the official site of the college.

External links 
 Official website

 Universities and colleges in Coimbatore